Associazione Sportiva Dilettantistica Elpidiense Cascinare is an Italian association football club located in Sant'Elpidio a Mare, Marche. It currently plays in Eccellenza.

External links
Official homepage

Football clubs in Italy
Football clubs in the Marche
Sant'Elpidio a Mare